DUJ may refer to:

 Dhaka Union of Journalists, a trade union of journalists based in Dhaka, Bangladesh
 DUJ, the IATA and FAA LID code for DuBois Regional Airport, Clearfield County, Pennsylvania